The following is the filmography of English actor Sir Christopher Lee (27 May 1922 – 7 June 2015).

With a career spanning nearly seven decades, Lee was well known for portraying Count Dracula in a sequence of Hammer Horror films, beginning with Dracula (1958). His other film roles include Francisco Scaramanga in the James Bond action film The Man with the Golden Gun (1974), Count Dooku in the Star Wars prequel trilogy (2002–2005), and Saruman in The Lord of the Rings film trilogy (2001–2003) and The Hobbit film trilogy (2012–2014).

Lee was knighted for services to drama and charity in 2009. He received the BAFTA Fellowship in 2011 and the BFI Fellowship in 2013. He considered his best performance to be that of Muhammad Ali Jinnah in the biopic Jinnah (1998), and his best film to be the British cult film The Wicker Man (1973). He frequently appeared opposite his friend Peter Cushing in numerous horror films, and late in his career had roles in six Tim Burton films.

Film

Television

Video games

Audiobooks

Awards and nominations

References

External links
 

Male actor filmographies
British filmographies